Prays sublevatella is a moth in the  family Plutellidae. It is found on Réunion island in the Indian Ocean.

This species has a wingspan of 15 mm and a wing length of 7 mm.

Its host plant is Olea lancea (Oleaceae).

External links
 Prays sublevatella at www.catalogueoflife.org.

Plutellidae
Moths of Africa
Moths described in 1957